The RotorWay A600 Talon is an American helicopter, designed and produced by RotorWay International of Chandler, Arizona. The aircraft is supplied as a kit for amateur construction.

By April 2017 the company seemed to have dropped the name Talon, referring to the aircraft just as the A600.

Design and development
The A600 Talon is a development of the RotorWay Exec and externally resembles the earlier design. The A600 incorporates a different structure, a shaft-driven tail rotor, taller and longer landing skids and a new in-house developed turbocharged powerplant.

The A600 features a single main rotor, a two-seats in side-by-side configuration enclosed cockpit with a windshield, skid-type landing gear and a turbocharged four-stroke,  RotorWay RI 600S engine that drives the  diameter two-bladed rotor and conventional  diameter two-bladed tail rotor.

Operational history
By February 2013 seven examples had been registered in the United States with the Federal Aviation Administration, one with the Civil Aviation Authority in the United Kingdom and one with Transport Canada.

Specifications

See also
DF Helicopters DF334
Dynali H2S
Heli-Sport CH-7

References

External links

2000s United States sport aircraft
2000s United States helicopters
Homebuilt aircraft
Single-engined piston helicopters